Round the clock may refer to:
a service available at any time, 24/7
Round the Clock (Darts), the game played on a dartboard
Round the Clock (radio), an English internet radio service from China Radio International

See also
"Around the Clock" (song)